Personality (1967–1990) was an American Thoroughbred racehorse who was voted 1970 American Horse of the Year honors.

Background
Personality was bred by the partnership of Isidor Bieber and owner/trainer Hirsch Jacobs. Sired by Hail To Reason, the 1960 American Champion Two-Year-Old Colt, Personality was out of U.S. Racing Hall of Fame inductee Affectionately, a daughter of another Hall of Fame inductee,  Swaps.

Personality was raced in the salmon pink-and-green silks  of Hirsch Jacobs' wife, Ethel. However, the Hall of Fame trainer died on February 23, 1970, and did not see his three-year-old colt's success that year. Son John took over the race conditioning of Personality and three-year-old stablemate High Echelon.

Racing career
Going into the 1970 U.S. Triple Crown series, Personality was made the second choice by bettors for the Kentucky Derby after winning an allowance race and then the important Wood Memorial Stakes at Aqueduct Racetrack. Ridden by Eddie Belmonte, Personality finished eighth to Dust Commander in the Derby but came back to win the Preakness Stakes from Corn Off The Cob and High Echelon. Two weeks later, he won the Jersey Derby, a race at Monmouth Park which at the time was used as a warm-up for the final leg of the Triple Crown. However, Personality developed a fever, and his handlers chose not to run him in the Belmont Stakes.  Stablemate High Echelon did run and won.

Personality did not return to racing until July 25, 1970, when he ran second in a field of older horses at Aqueduct Racetrack. On August 14, he won the Jim Dandy Stakes at Saratoga Race Course and finished second in the September 21 Stymie Handicap at Belmont Park. On October 4, 1970, Personality beat older horses in the Woodward Stakes to clinch American Horse of the Year honors from the Thoroughbred Racing Association. In the rival Daily Racing Form poll, he finished runner-up to Fort Marcy

Personality's best results in top races at age four were a second in the Excelsior Handicap and a third in the Paumonok Handicap.

Stud record
Retired to stud duty, Personality met with very limited success as a sire and in 1979 was sold to a Japanese breeding operation, where he died on November 20, 1990, at age twenty-three.

Breeding

References

1967 racehorse births
1990 racehorse deaths
Racehorses bred in Kentucky
Racehorses trained in the United States
Preakness Stakes winners
American Thoroughbred Horse of the Year
Thoroughbred family 1-x